Bethlehem Township may refer to:

Indiana
 Bethlehem Township, Cass County, Indiana
 Bethlehem Township, Clark County, Indiana

Missouri
 Bethlehem Township, Henry County, Missouri

New Jersey
 Bethlehem Township, New Jersey

Ohio
 Bethlehem Township, Coshocton County, Ohio
 Bethlehem Township, Stark County, Ohio

Pennsylvania
Bethlehem Township, Northampton County, Pennsylvania

See also
 Bethlehem (disambiguation)

Township name disambiguation pages